Boglárka Kapás (born 22 April 1993) is a Hungarian competitive swimmer. She is the world champion (2019 Gwangju) in 200 m butterfly and a bronze medallist at the Olympic Games (2016 Rio de Janeiro) in 800 m freestyle.

Career
Kapás won Hungary's first ever gold medal at the 2010 Summer Youth Olympics in 200 m butterfly. Qualified for the final with the best time, she swam a personal best 2:08.72, finishing 1.4 seconds ahead of second placed Judit Ignacio. She won one more gold medal in 400 m freestyle and a silver medal in 200 m freestyle.

At the 2010 European Short Course Swimming Championships in Eindhoven Kapás won the silver medal in 800m freestyle, with a time of 8:18.56. The event was notable in that it was a heat-declared result (medals based on times from heats with no final swum), where Kapás won the heat for the top seeded swimmers by a comfortable margin; however, lost the event to Federica Pellegrini who had raced earlier in the 'slower' heat.

She passed the Olympic A-standard in 800m freestyle and earned a quota for the Games at the first meeting of the 2011 Mare Nostrum series in early June. In July 2011 at the 2011 Swimming World Championships she set a new national record in the same distance with a time of 8:24.79, which was enough for the fifth place. In November Kapás suffered a rib injury, that forced her to miss both the 2011 European Short Course Swimming Championships and the United States–Europe swimming gala.

After returning from injury, Kapás won the 800m freestyle event of the 2012 European Aquatics Championships on home soil in Debrecen.

At the 2016 Summer Olympics in Rio, Kapás came third in the 800m freestyle behind Katie Ledecky and Jazz Carlin, thus getting the bronze medal. She set a new national record time for this event of 8:16:37.

At the 2019 World Aquatics Championships she won the gold medal in the 200m butterfly event.

In the 2019 ISL season she was in team London Roar and they got the second place in the first ISL final in history. In 2020 she changed teams and was part of the NY Breakers and swam in the semi finals.

Personal life

Kapás, who goes by the nickname "Bogi," is engaged to fellow Breaker Ádám Telegdy. She has two cats named Vanilla and Csoki, which means “chocolate.” She cites winning a maths contest in elementary school as one of her most memorable accomplishments.

Awards
Hungarian Junior Athlete of the Year – the National Sports Association (NSSZ) awards: 2010
MOB Junior award (2010)
Junior Príma award (2010)
Hungarian swimmer of the Year: 2011
  Cross of Merit of Hungary – Bronze Cross (2012)
For Újpest award (2016)
  Cross of Merit of Hungary – Golden Cross (2016)
Budapest Pro Urbe award (2016)

References

External links

 

1993 births
Living people
Sportspeople from Debrecen
Hungarian female swimmers
Hungarian female freestyle swimmers
Olympic swimmers of Hungary
Swimmers at the 2008 Summer Olympics
Swimmers at the 2012 Summer Olympics
Swimmers at the 2016 Summer Olympics
Swimmers at the 2010 Summer Youth Olympics
European Aquatics Championships medalists in swimming
World Aquatics Championships medalists in swimming
Olympic bronze medalists for Hungary
Medalists at the 2016 Summer Olympics
Olympic bronze medalists in swimming
Youth Olympic gold medalists for Hungary
Swimmers at the 2020 Summer Olympics
21st-century Hungarian women